James Edward Shaw (April 2, 1938 - 2018) was an American football coach.  He served as the head football coach at the University of Arkansas at Pine Bluff for four seasons, from 1976 to 1979, compiling a record of 15–24–1.  A graduated of Miles College in Birmingham, Alabama, Shaw began his coaching career at Carver High School in Bessemer, Alabama.  He was assistant football coach at Alcorn Agricultural and Mechanical College—now known as Alcorn State University—from 1966 to 1968 and at Eastern Michigan University, where he earned a master's degree in health and physical education.  Shaw was the offensive coordinator at Southern University for four seasons, from 1972 to 1975, prior to being hired at Arkansas–Pine Bluff in January 1976.

Head coaching record

College

References

1938 births
2018 deaths
American football halfbacks
Alcorn State Braves football coaches
Arkansas–Pine Bluff Golden Lions football coaches
Eastern Michigan Eagles football coaches
Miles Golden Bears football players
Southern Jaguars football coaches
High school football coaches in Alabama
Eastern Michigan University alumni
People from Fayette, Alabama
Players of American football from Alabama
African-American coaches of American football
African-American players of American football
20th-century African-American sportspeople
21st-century African-American people